Crockett Technical High School can refer to:
 A former name of Memphis Technical High School
 A school in the Detroit Public Schools district